Larry Ward may refer to:
 Larry Ward (actor) (1924–1985), American actor from the television series The Dakotas
 Larry Ward (politician) (born 1947), Canadian politician in Saskatchewan

See also
Lawrence M. Ward, neuroscientist and psychophysicist
Laurie Ward, rugby league player